Sonia Mann is an Indian actress and model. She has appeared in films and music videos.

Early life and education
Mann was born on 10 September 1986 in Haldwani to Baldev Singh Mann and Paramjit Kaur. Her father was a left wing activist. He was killed by militants in Amritsar on 26 September 1986 when he was on his way to see his new-born daughter. She was brought up in Amritsar. She completed her school life from Holy Heart Presidency School. Then she completed her college life from BBK DAV College for Women, Amritsar.

Career

Mann appeared in many Punjabi music videos. Her Malayalam film Hide n' Seek in 2012. Then, she appeared in another Malayalam film titled Teens which was released in 2013. She also appeared in a Punjabi film titled Haani which was released in 2013. Her Punjabi film Bade Changey Ne Mere Yaar Kaminey was released in 2014. She also appeared in a Hindi film in that year titled Kahin Hai Mera Pyar.

Mann's Telugu film Dhee Ante Dhee was released in 2015. Her Punjabi film 25 Kille was released in 2016. Her another Punjabi film titled Motor Mitraan Di was also released in that year.

Mann did a cameo role on a Marathi film titled Hrudayantar in 2017. Her second Telugu film titled Dr. Chakravarthy was also released in that year. She was also a part of hindi film Happy Hardy and Heer which was released on 31 January 2020.

Filmography

Music videos

References

External links

Living people
1990 births
Guru Nanak Dev University alumni
Actresses in Punjabi cinema
Actresses in Telugu cinema
Actresses in Malayalam cinema
Actresses in Hindi cinema
Actresses in Marathi cinema
Indian female models
People from Haldwani